This is a list reptiles in Guatemala, including snakes, lizards, crocodilians, and turtles.
Guatemala has a large variety of habitats, from tropical rain forests, dry thorn scrubs, cloud forests, coastal marshes, pine forests, mountains and lowlands. This vast contrast in biomes makes Guatemala home to a large variety of herpetofauna. These include approximately 240 species of reptiles, subdivided in 3 orders and 29 families.



Turtles (Testudines)

Cheloniidae 

Order: Testudines. 
Family: Cheloniidae

Sea turtles (Cheloniidae) are a family of large tortoises found in all tropical seas and some subtropical and temperate seas. Sea turtles evolved from land turtles about 120 million years ago and are well adapted to life in the sea. Sea turtles eat mostly jellyfish, crustaceans and squid. There are 6 species worldwide, of which at least 5 are currently endangered.
 Loggerhead sea turtleCaretta caretta (Linnaeus, 1758) [EN]
 Pacific green turtleChelonia agassizii Bocourt, 1868 [EN]
 Green sea turtleChelonia mydas (Linnaeus, 1758) [EN]
 Hawksbill sea turtleEretmochelys imbricata (Linnaeus, 1766) [CR]
 Olive ridley sea turtleLepidochelys olivacea (Eschscholtz, 1829) [VU]

Dermochelyidae 

Order: Testudines. 
Family: Dermochelyidae

The leatherback turtles are large marine turtles with longitudinally folded carapaces lacking the bony plates of other turtles. The species are well adapted to marine life and have bodies that are streamlined for faster swimming. In contrast to most sea turtles, leatherback turtles are often found in the cooler waters of temperate regions. The family has only one species left and is critically endangered. All other species are only known as fossils.
 Leatherback turtleDermochelys coriacea (Vandelli, 1761) [CR]

Chelydridae 

Order: Testudines. 
Family: Chelydridae

Chelydridae is a family of turtles which has seven extinct and two extant genera, both endemic to the Western Hemisphere. The extant genera are Chelydra the snapping turtles, and its larger relative Macrochelys, of which the alligator snapping turtle (Macrochelys temminckii) is the only species.
 Common snapping turtleChelydra serpentina (Linnaeus, 1758)

Dermatemydidae 

Order: Testudines. 
Family: Dermatemydidae

The Central American river turtle is the only living species in the family Dermatemydidae. It is a nocturnal, aquatic turtle that lives in larger rivers and lakes in Central America, from southern Mexico to northern Honduras. It is one of the world's most heavily exploited turtles and is classified a critically endangered species by the IUCN.
It is a fairly large turtle, attaining a maximum size of 65 cm (25 inches) in carapace length, and can weigh in the range of 20 kg (44 lbs). They have a flattened carapace, that is usually a solid grey or almost black in color. Their plastron is normally cream colored.
 Central American river turtleDermatemys mawii Gray, 1847 [CR]

Emydidae 

Order: Testudines. 
Family: Emydidae

Emydidae, commonly called pond turtles or marsh turtles is a family of turtles which mostly occur in the Western Hemisphere. The family Emydidae includes close to 50 species in 10 genera.
 Furrowed wood turtleRhinoclemmys areolata (Duméril and Bibron, 1851)
 Painted wood turtleRhinoclemmys pulcherrima (Gray, 1855)
 Pond sliderTrachemys scripta (Schoepff, 1792)

Kinosternidae 

Order: Testudines. 
Family: Kinosternidae

Kinosternidae is a family of mostly small turtles, native to the Americas. They inhabit slow-moving bodies of water, often with soft, muddy bottoms and abundant vegetation. All members of the family are carnivorous, feeding on crustaceans, aquatic insects, mollusks, annelids, amphibians, small fish, and sometimes carrion. The family Kinosternidae currently contains 25 species within 4 genera.
 Tabasco mud turtleKinosternon acutum (Gray, 1831)
 White-lipped mud turtleKinosternon leucostomum Duméril and Bibron, 1851 [VU]
 Scorpion mud turtleKinosternon scorpioides (Linnaeus, 1766)
 Narrow-bridged musk turtleClaudius angustatus Cope, 1865
 Giant musk turtleStaurotypus salvinii Gray, 1864
 Mexican musk turtleStaurotypus triporcatus (Wiegmann, 1828)

Crocodilians (Crocodylia)

Crocodylidae 

Order: Crocodylia. 
Family: Crocodylidae

Crocodylidae is a family of large aquatic reptiles that live throughout the tropics in Africa, Asia, the Americas and Australia. Crocodiles tend to congregate in freshwater habitats like rivers, lakes, wetlands and sometimes in brackish water. Crocodiles are ambush hunters, waiting for fish or land animals to come close, then rushing out to attack. As cold-blooded predators, they have a very slow metabolism, and thus can survive long periods without food. They feed mostly on vertebrates like fish, reptiles, and mammals, sometimes on invertebrates like molluscs and crustaceans, depending on species. Despite their appearance of being slow, crocodiles are very fast over short distances, even out of water.
 American crocodileCrocodylus acutus Cuvier, 1807 [VU]
 Morelet's crocodileCrocodylus moreletii Duméril and Bocourt, 1851

Alligatoridae 

Order: Crocodylia. 
Family: Alligatoridae

Alligatoridae is a family of crocodylians that includes alligators and caimans. Its species are large aquatic reptiles that live in freshwater habitats throughout the Americas (6 or 7 species) and in China (1 species).
 Spectacled caimanCaiman crocodilus Linnaeus, 1758

Lizards (Squamata - suborder Lacertilia)

Anguidae 
Order: Squamata. 
Family: Anguidae

Anguidae is a large and diverse family of lizards native to the Northern Hemisphere. The group includes the slowworms, glass lizards, and alligator lizards, among others. Anguidae is divided into three subfamilies and contains 94 species in eight genera. Their closest living relatives are the helodermatid lizards.
Anguids are carnivorous or insectivorous, and inhabit a wide range of different habitats. The group includes both egg-laying and viviparous species. Most species are terrestrial, although some climb trees.
 Abronia anzuetoi Campbell and Frost, 1994
 Abronia aurita (Cope, 1869)
 Abronia campbelli Brodie and Savage, 1993
 Abronia fimbriata (Cope, 1885)
 Abronia frosti Campbell, Sasa, Acevedo, and Mendelson, 1998
 Abronia gaiophantasma Campbell and Frost, 1993
 Abronia matudai (Hartweg and Tihen, 1946)
 Abronia meledona Campbell and Brodie, 1999
 Abronia vasconcelosi (Bocourt, 1872)
 Mesaspis moreletii (Bocourt, 1872)
 Diploglossus atitlanensis (Smith and Taylor, 1950)
 Diploglossus bivittatus Boulenger, 1895
 Diploglossus rozellae (Smith, 1942)

Gekkonidae 

Order: Squamata. 
Family: Gekkonidae

Geckos are lizards found in warm climates throughout the world. They range from 1.6 cm to 60 cm. Geckos are unique among lizards in their vocalizations, making chirping sounds in social interactions with other geckos. Geckos are the second most species rich group of lizards with close to 1,500 different species worldwide. 
All geckos, excluding the family Eublepharidae, have no eyelids and instead have a transparent membrane which they lick to clean. Many species will, in defense, expel a foul-smelling material and feces onto their aggressors. There are also many species that will drop their tails in defense. Many species are well known for their specialized toe pads that enable them to climb smooth and vertical surfaces, and even cross indoor ceilings with ease. Unlike most lizards, geckos are usually nocturnal and are great climbers. Geckos come in various patterns and colors such as purple, pink, blue, and black, and are among the most colorful lizards in the world.
 St. George Island geckoAristelliger georgeensis (Bocourt, 1870)
 Yucatán banded geckoColeonyx elegans Gray, 1845
 Central American banded geckoColeonyx mitratus Peters, 1863
 Yellow-headed geckoGonatodes albogularis (Duméril and Bibron, 1836)
 Common house geckoHemidactylus frenatus Schlegel, 1836
 Belize leaf-toed geckoPhyllodactylus insularis Dixon, 1960
 Yellow-bellied geckoPhyllodactylus tuberculosus Wiegmann, 1834
 Sphaerodactylus glaucus Cope, 1865
 Sphaerodactylus millepunctatus Hallowell, 1861
 Turnip-tailed geckoThecadactylus rapicauda (Houttuyn, 1782)

Helodermatidae 
Order: Squamata. 
Family: Helodermatidae

Heloderma, the only genus of the family Helodermatidae, consists of venomous lizards native to Guatemala, Mexico and the southwestern United States. Their closest living relatives are the anguid lizards. Helodermatids (or beaded lizards) are large, stocky, slow-moving reptiles that prefer semi-arid habitats. The tails are short and used as fat storage organs. They are covered with small, non-overlapping bead-like scales. Both species are dark in color, with yellowish or pinkish markings. The species' venom glands are located in the lower jaw, unlike snakes' venom glands, which are located in the upper jaw. The venom is typically used only in defense, rather than in subduing prey, and the lizard must chew on its victim to work the venom into the flesh. Helodermatids are carnivorous, preying on rodents and other small mammals, and eating the eggs of birds and reptiles. They are oviparous, laying large clutches of eggs. 
The family Helodermatidae includes two species, with six subspecies. The species found in Guatemala is the beaded lizard (Heloderma horridum), which occurs in two subspecies, including the Motagua Valley subspecies (H. h. charlesborgeti), one of the rarest lizards in the world, with a wild population of fewer than 200 animals.
 Beaded lizardHeloderma horridum (Wiegmann, 1829)

Corytophanidae 

Order: Squamata. 
Family: Corytophanidae

Corytophanidae is a family of lizards, commonly called casque head lizards or helmeted lizards. Casque heads are moderately sized forest-dwelling lizards with laterally compressed bodies. They typically have well-developed head crests in the shape of a casque. This crest is a sexually dimorphic characteristic in males of Basiliscus, but is present in both sexes of Corytophanes and Laemanctus. The crests are used in defensive displays where the lateral aspect of the body is brought about to face a potential predator in an effort to look bigger. Unlike many of their close relatives, they are unable to break off their tails when captured, probably because the tail is essential as a counterbalance during rapid movement. Despite the small size of the group, it includes both egg-laying species and some that give birth to live young. They are found from Mexico, through Central America, and as far south as Ecuador. There are 9 known species of casque heads. 6 of which occur in Guatemala.
 Brown basiliskBasiliscus vittatus Wiegmann, 1828
 Helmeted iguanaCorytophanes cristatus (Merrem, 1821)
 Hernandez's helmeted basiliskCorytophanes hernandesii (Wiegmann, 1831)
 Guatemalan helmeted basiliskCorytophanes percarinatus Duméril, 1856
 Eastern casquehead iguanaLaemanctus longipes Wiegmann, 1834
 Serrated casquehead iguanaLaemanctus serratus Cope, 1864

Iguanidae 

Order: Squamata. 
Family: Iguanidae

Iguanidae is a family of lizards that live in the Americas, from the southern United States to Paraguay, and from the Caribbean islands, to the Galápagos Islands and the Fiji Islands. Iguanas can reach lengths of 14 to 200 cm. The tail is often longer than the rest of the body. They often have dewlaps that help regulate body temperature, and rows of spines on their back, which are more pronounced in males than in females. Some iguanas species are terrestrial, others prefer living in trees or rocks. The males of most species are territorial and defend their territory against other males, but tolerate females. All iguanas are oviparous. The nests are usually quite large; often several females lay their eggs in close proximity. Juveniles feed mainly on insects and other invertebrates, while adults, especially the larger species, switch to a plant-based diet. The marine iguanas of the Galápagos Islands feed mainly on algae and seaweed.
 Guatemalan spiny-tailed iguanaCtenosaura palearis Stejneger, 1899 (E, EN)
 Black spiny-tailed iguanaCtenosaura similis (Gray, 1831)
 Green iguanaIguana iguana (Linnaeus, 1758)

Phrynosomatidae 

Order: Squamata. 
Family: Phrynosomatidae

Phrynosomatidae is a diverse family of lizards, found from Panama to the extreme south of Canada. Many members of the group are adapted to life in hot, sandy deserts, although the spiny lizards prefer rocky deserts or even relatively moist forest edges, and the short-horned lizard lives in prairie or sagebrush environments. The group includes both egg-laying and viviparous species, with the latter being more common in species living at high elevations. There are 136 species in the Americas, 16 of which occur in Guatemala.
 Giant horned lizardPhrynosoma asio Cope, 1864
 Bocourt's spiny lizardSceloporus acanthinus Bocourt, 1873
 Keeled spiny lizardSceloporus carinatus Smith, 1936
 Yellow-spotted spiny lizardSceloporus chrysostictus Cope, 1866
 Sceloporus internasalis Smith and Bumzahem, 1955
 Lundell's spiny lizardSceloporus lundelli Smith, 1939
 Pastel tree lizardSceloporus melanorhinus Bocourt, 1876
 Sceloporus prezygus Smith, 1942
 Sceloporus schmidti Jones, 1927
 Rough-scaled lizardSceloporus serrifer Cope, 1866
 Longtail spiny lizardSceloporus siniferus Cope, 1869
 Bocourt's emerald lizardSceloporus smaragdinus Bocourt, 1873
 Dwarf spiny lizardSceloporus squamosus Bocourt, 1874
 Guatemalan emerald spiny lizardSceloporus taeniocnemis Cope, 1885
 Teapen rosebelly lizardSceloporus teapensis Günther, 1890
 Rosebelly lizardSceloporus variabilis Wiegmann, 1834

Polychrotidae 

Order: Squamata. 
Family: Polychrotidae

Polychrotidae is a family of lizards commonly known as anoles. 
Anoles are small and common lizards found in the Americas, from southeastern United States, the Caribbean, Central America and South America. A large majority of them have a green coloration, although they can change their color based on mood and surroundings. Anoles are a diverse and plentiful group of lizards. NCBI places the anoles in the subfamily Polychrotinae of the family Iguanidae. There are currently about 372 known species in the Americas, and 20 species in Guatemala.
 Allison's anoleAnolis allisoni Barbour, 1928
 Becker's anoleNorops beckeri (Boulenger, 1881)
 Neotropical green anoleNorops biporcatus (Wiegmann, 1834)
 Norops bourgeaei (Bocourt, 1873) [Anolis laeviventris?]
 Bighead anoleNorops capito (Peters, 1863)
 Stuart's anoleNorops cobanensis (Stuart, 1942)
 Ornate anoleNorops crassulus (Cope, 1864)
 Cristifer anoleNorops cristifer (Smith, 1968)
 Copper anoleNorops cupreus (Hallowell, 1860)
 Coffee anoleNorops dollfusianus (Bocourt, 1873) [Anolis
 White anoleNorops laeviventris (Wiegmann, 1834) [Anolis laeviventris]
 Ghost anoleNorops lemurinus (Cope, 1861)
 Norops matudai (Smith, 1956)
 Norops nannodes (Cope, 1864)
 Peters' anoleNorops petersii (Bocourt, 1873)
 Norops rodriguezii (Bocourt, 1873)
 Cuban brown anoleNorops sagrei (Duméril and Bibron, 1837)
 Silky anoleNorops sericeus (Hallowell, 1856)
 Greater scaly anoleNorops tropidonotus (Peters, 1863)
 Lesser acaly anoleNorops uniformis (Cope, 1885)

Scincidae 
Order: Squamata.
Family: Scincidae

Scincidae is a family of lizards commonly known as called skinks. Skinks look roughly like true lizards, but most species have no pronounced neck and their legs are relatively small; in fact several genera (e.g., Typhlosaurus) have no limbs at all. Some other genera, such as Neoseps, have reduced limbs, lacking forelegs, and with fewer than five toes (digits) on each foot. In such species, their locomotion resembles that of snakes more than that of lizards with well-developed limbs. Most species of skinks have long, tapering tails that they can shed if a predator grabs the tail. Most skinks are medium-sized with snout-to-vent lengths of about 12 cm (4 or 5 in), although some species are either smaller or larger. Skinks are generally carnivorous and in particular insectivorous. Typical prey includes flies, crickets, grasshoppers, beetles, and caterpillars. Various species also eat earthworms, millipedes, snails, slugs, isopods, other lizards, and small rodents. Species occur in a variety of habitats worldwide, except in boreal and polar regions. With about 1200 described species, the Scincidae are the second most diverse family of lizards, exceeded only by the Gekkonidae (or geckos).
 Sumichrast's skinkEumeces sumichrasti (Cope, 1866) [Plestiodon sumichrasti]
 Central American mabuyaMabuya brachypoda Taylor, 1956
 Schwartze's skinkMesoscincus schwartzei (Fischer, 1884)
 Sphenomorphus assatum (Cope, 1864)
 Brown forest skinkSpenomorphus cherriei (Cope, 1893) [Scincella cherriei]
 Stuart's forest skinkSphenomorphus incertum (Stuart, 1940)

Teiidae 

Order: Squamata. 
Family: Teiidae

Teiidae is a family of lizards native to the Americas, generally known as whiptails. 
Teiids have large rectangular scales that form distinct transverse rows ventrally and generally small granular scales dorsally, they have head scales that are separate from the skull bones. All teiids have well-developed limbs and a forked, snake-like tongue. Teiids are terrestrial and diurnal, and are primarily carnivorous or insectivorous, although some will include a small amount of plant matter in their diet. They all lay eggs, with some species laying very large clutches. There are ten genera with over 230 species, 8 of which occur in Guatemala.
 Yucatan whiptailCnemidophorus angusticeps Cope, 1877
 Blackbelly racerunnerCnemidophorus deppii Wiegmann, 1834 Aspidoscelis deppei
 Rainbow lizardCnemidophorus lemniscatus (Linnaeus, 1758)
 Cozumel racerunnerCnemidophorus maslini Fritts, 1969 [Aspidoscelis cozumelae maslini]
 Giant whiptailCnemidophorus motaguae Sackett, 1941
 Chaitzam's ameivaHolcosus chaitzami Stuart, 1942
 Middle American ameivaHolcosus festivus (Lichtenstein, 1856)
 Rainbow ameivaHolcosus undulatus (Wiegmann, 1834)

Gymnophthalmidae 
Order: Squamata. 
Family: Gymnophthalmidae

Gymnophthalmidae is a family of lizards, sometimes known as spectacled lizards or microteiids. They are called 'spectacled' because of their transparent lower eyelids, so they can still see with closed eyes. Like most lizards, but unlike geckos, these eyelids are movable. Spectacled lizards are related to the Teiidae, but they look like skinks with smooth scales. They are generally small lizards; many species have reduced limbs. Gymnophthalmids live in a wide variety of habitats, from desert to mountain to rain forest, throughout Central America and South America. They are usually inhabitants of the forest floor or wet areas associated with tropical forests, either nocturnal or intermittently active throughout the day. Spectacled lizards eat mostly insects and other invertebrates, and all species lay eggs.
 Golden spectacled teguGymnophthalmus speciosus (Hallowell, 1871)

Xantusiidae 

Order: Squamata. 
Family: Xantusiidae

Night lizards (family name Xantusiidae) are a group of very small, viviparous (live-bearing) lizards, averaging from less than 4 cm to over 12 cm long. They have relatively flat bodies and heads. Their heads are covered by large, smooth plates, while their bodies have rougher, granular skin. Their eyes, like those of snakes, are covered by immoveable, transparent membranes that function as eyelids. They feed on insects and sometimes plants.
Night lizards were originally thought to be nocturnal because of their secretive lifestyle, but they are in fact strictly diurnal. Night lizards have evolved to live in very narrow environmental niches—"microhabitat specialization"—such as rock crevices or damp logs, and may spend their entire life under the same cover. 
The family has only three genera with the following geographical distribution: Xantusia in southwestern United States and Baja California, Cricosaura in Cuba, and Lepidophyma in Central America. There is a total of approximately 23 living species, 3 of which occur in Guatemala.
 Yellow-spotted tropical night lizardLepidophyma flavimaculatum A. Duméril, 1851
 Mayan tropical night lizardLepidophyma mayae Bezy, 1973
 Smith's tropical night lizardLepidophyma smithii Bocourt, 1876

Xenosauridae 
Order: Squamata. 
Family: Xenosauridae

Xenosauridae is a family of lizards native to Central America and China. Also known as knob-scaled lizards, they have rounded, bumpy scales and osteoderms. Most species prefer moist or semi-aquatic habitats, although they are widespread within their native regions, with some even inhabiting semi-arid scrub environments. They are carnivorous or insectivorous, and give birth to live young. There are approximately seven species worldwide, one of which occurs in Guatemala.
 Xenosaurus rackhami Stuart, 1941 [Xenosaurus grandis rackhami Stuart, 1941]

Snakes (Squamata - suborder Serpentes) 
Guatemala is home to approximately 134 species of snakes, grouped in 8 families. Most snakes are colubrid snakes (105 species), followed by the viperids (13 species), and the elapids (8 species).

Leptotyphlopidae 

Order: Squamata.
Family: Leptotyphlopidae

The Leptotyphlopidae, commonly called slender blind snakes or thread snakes, are a family of snakes found in the Americas, Africa, and Asia. All are fossorial, adapted to burrowing, and feed on ants and termites. These are relatively small snakes rarely exceeding 30 cm in length. The body is cylindrical with blunt head and short tail. Scales are highly polished. Their diet consists mostly of termites or ants, their larvae and pupae. The pheremones they produce protect them from attack by termites. Two genera are recognized, comprising 87 species, one of which occurs in Guatemala.
 Black blind snakeLeptotyphlops goudotii (Duméril and Bibron, 1844)

Typhlopidae 

Order: Squamata. 
Family: Typhlopidae

The Typhlopidae are a family of blind snakes. They are found mostly in the tropical regions of Africa, Asia, the Americas, mainland Australia and various islands. The rostral scale overhangs the mouth to form a shovel like burrowing structure. They live underground in burrows, and since they have no use for vision, their eyes are mostly vestigial. They have light-detecting black eyespots, and teeth occur in the upper jaw. The tail ends with a horn like scale. Most of these species are oviparous. Currently, 6 genera are recognized containing 203 species.
 Brahminy blind snakeRamphotyphlops braminus (Daudin, 1803)
 Yucatán blind snakeTyphlops microstomus Cope, 1866
 Coffee worm snakeTyphlops tenuis Salvin, 1860

Boidae 

Order: Squamata. 
Family: Boidae

The Boidae are a family of nonvenomous snakes found in America, Africa, Europe, Asia and some Pacific Islands. Relatively primitive snakes, adults are medium to large in size, with females usually larger than the males. Prey is killed by a process known as constriction; after an animal has been grasped to restrain it, a number of coils are hastily wrapped around it. Then, by applying and maintaining sufficient pressure to prevent it from inhaling, the prey eventually succumbs due to asphyxiation. Two subfamilies comprising eight genera and 43 species are currently recognized. Two species occur in Guatemala.
Northern boaBoa imperator 
Ringed tree boaCorallus annulatus (Cope, 1875)

Loxocemidae 

Order: Squamata. 
Family: Loxocemidae

Loxocemidae is a monotypic family of snakes created for the monotypic genus Loxocemus that contains one single species L. bicolor, which is native to Mexico and Central America. They are found in a variety of habitats, including tropical moist and dry forests. Adults grow to a maximum of 1.57 m (62 in) in length, with an average length of roughly 91 cm (3 ft). The body is stout and very muscular. L. bicolor is a nocturnal and semi-fossorial snake, that feeds on small rodents and lizards. It has also been observed eating iguana eggs.
 Mexican pythonLoxocemus bicolor Cope, 1861

Tropidophiidae 
Order: Squamata. 
Family: Tropidophiidae

The Tropidophiinae, common name dwarf boas, are a subfamily of snakes found from Mexico and the West Indies south to southeastern Brazil. These are small to medium-sized fossorial snakes, some with beautiful and striking color patterns. 
These snakes are very small, averaging to about 30–60 cm in length. Most species spend their day burrowed underground or under vegetation, surfacing only at night or when it rains. Some species are arboreal and are often seen hiding in bromeliads in trees. They can change color from light (when they are active at night) to dark (inactive in the day). This color change is brought about by the movement of dark pigment granules. When threatened, they coil up into a tight ball. A more peculiar defensive behavior is their ability to bleed voluntarily from the eyes, mouth, and nostrils. Currently, there is a total of 4 living genera containing 22 species, and one species that occurs in Guatemala.
Chiapan boaUngaliophis continentalis Müller, 1880

Colubridae 
Order: Squamata. 
Family: Colubridae

Colubridae (from Latin coluber, snake) is a family of snakes. This broad classification of snakes includes about two-thirds of all snake species on earth. The earliest species of the snake family date back to the Oligocene epoch. 
While most colubrids are nonvenomous (or have venom that is not known to be harmful to humans) and are mostly harmless, a few groups, such as genus Boiga, can produce medically significant bites. Colubridae is the largest snake family and Colubrid species are found on every continent except Antarctica. There are 304 genera and 1,938 colubrid species worldwide, and 105 species occurring in Guatemala.

 Dary's burrowing snakeAdelphicos daryi Campbell and Ford, 1982 (EN)
 Adelphicos ibarrorum Campbell and Brodie, 1988
 Guatemala burrowing snakeAdelphicos veraepacis Stuart, 1941
 Middle American burrowing snakeAdelphicos quadrivirgatum Jan, 1862
 Rustyhead snakeAmastridium veliferum Cope, 1861
 Chapinophis xanthocheilus Campbell and Smith, 1998 (E)
 MussuranaClelia clelia Daudin, 1803
 Mexican snake eaterClelia scytalina Cope, 1866
 Eastern racerColuber constrictor Linnaeus, 1758
 Two-spotted snakeConiophanes bipunctatus Günther
 Yellowbelly snakeConiophanes fissidens Günther
 Black-striped snakeConiophanes imperialis (Kennicott, 1859)
 Cope's black-striped snakeConiophanes piceivittis Cope, 1869
 Five-striped snakeConiophanes quinquevittatus Duméril, Bibron, and Duméril, 1854
 Faded black-striped snakeConiophanes schmidti Bailey, 1937
 Conophis lineatus Duméril, Bibron, and Duméril, 1854
 Crisantophis nevermanni (Dunn, 1937)
 Pink-tailed forest racerDendrophidion nuchalis (Peters, 1864
 Barred forest racerDendrophidion vinitor Smith, 1941
 Dipsas brevifacies (Cope, 1866)
 Dryadophis dorsalis (Bocourt, 1890)
 Dryadophis melanolomus (Cope, 1868)
 Eastern indigo snakeDrymarchon corais (Boie, 1827)
 Green highland racerDrymobius chloroticus (Cope, 1886)
 Speckled racerDrymobius margariterus (Schlegel, 1837)
 Mexican night snakeElaphe flavirufa (Cope, 1867)
 Pacific longtail snakeEnulius flavitorques Cope, 1868
 Blotched hook-nosed snakeFicimia publia Cope, 1866
 Chiapas earth snakeGeophis cancellatus Smith, 1941
 Keeled earth snakeGeophis carinosus Stuart, 1941
 Mertens' earth snakeGeophis fulvoguttatus Mertens, 1952
 Downs' earth snakeGeophis immaculatus Downs, 1967
 Coffee earth snakeGeophis nasalis Cope, 1868
 Rosebelly earth snakeGeophis rhodogaster (Cope, 1868)
 Costa Rica water snakeHydromorphus concolor Peters, 1859
 Blunthead tree snakeImantodes cenchoa (Linnaeus, 1758)
 Central American tree snakeImantodes gemmistratus (Cope, 1861)
 Milk snakeLampropeltis triangulum (Lacépède, 1789)
 Banded cat-eyed snakeLeptodeira annulata (Linnaeus, 1758)
 Rainforest cat-eyed snakeLeptodeira frenata (Cope, 1886)
 Black-banded cat-eyed snakeLeptodeira nigrofasciata Günther, 1868
 Leptodeira polysticta Günther, 1895 [Leptodeira septentrionalis polysticta]
 Striped lowland snakeLeptodrymus pulcherrimus (Cope, 1874)
 Parrot snakeLeptophis ahaetulla (Linnaeus, 1758)
 Mexican parrot snakeLeptophis mexicanus Duméril, Bibron, and Duméril, 1854
 Cloud forest parrot snakeLeptophis modestus (Günther, 1872)
 Masticophis mentovarius (Duméril, Bibron, and Duméril, 1854)
 Ringneck coffee snakeNinia diademata Baird and Girard, 1853
 Ninia pavimentata (Bocourt, 1883)
 Redback coffee snakeNinia sebae (Duméril, Bibron, and Duméril, 1854)
 Brown vine snakeOxybelis aeneus (Wagler, 1830)
 Green vine snakeOxybelis fulgidus (Daudin, 1803)
 False coralOxyrhopus petola (Linnaeus, 1758)
 Middle American gopher snakePituophis lineaticollis (Cope, 1861)
 Variegated false coral snakePliocercus elapoides Cope, 1860
 Puffing snakePseustes poecilonotus (Günther, 1858)
 Rhadinaea anachoreta Smith and Campbell, 1994
 Rhadinaea decorata (Günther, 1858)
 Godman's graceful brown snakeRhadinaea godmani (Günther, 1865)
 Hannstein's spot-lipped snakeRhadinaea hannsteini (Stuart, 1949)
 Hempstead's pine woods snakeRhadinaea hempsteadae Stuart and Bailey, 1941
 Kinkelin graceful brown snakeRhadinaea kinkelini Boettger, 1898
 Tearful pine-oak snakeRhadinaea lachrymans (Cope, 1870)
 Monte Cristi graceful brown snakeRhadinaea montecristi Mertens, 1952
 Stuart's graceful brown snakeRhadinaea pilonaorum (Stuart, 1954)
 Posada's graceful brown snakeRhadinaea posadasi (Slevin, 1936)
 Rhadinaea stadelmani Stuart and Bailey, 1941
 Guatemala neckband snakeScaphiodontophis annulatus (Duméril, Bibron, and Duméril, 1854)
 Black-banded snakeScolecophis atrocinctus (Schlegel, 1837)
 Senticollis triaspis (Cope, 1866)
 Cope's snail suckerSibon anthracops (Cope, 1868)
 Carr's snail suckerSibon carri (Shreve, 1951)
 Sibon dimidiata (Günther, 1872)
 Sibon fischeri (Boulenger, 1894)
 Sibon nebulata (Linnaeus, 1758)
 Sibon sanniola (Cope, 1867)
 Sibon sartorii (Cope, 1863)
 Chicken snakeSpilotes pullatus (Linnaeus, 1758)
 Stenorrhina degenhardti (Berthold, 1846)
 Stenorrhina freminvillii Duméril, Bibron, and Duméril, 1854
 Brown snakeStoreria dekayi (Holbrook, 1842)
 Yucatán white-lipped snakeSymphimus mayae (Gaige, 1936)
 Baird's black-headed snakeTantilla bairdi Stuart, 1941
 Mertens' centipede snakeTantilla brevicauda Mertens, 1952
 Peten centipede snakeTantilla cuniculator Smith, 1939
 Jan's centipede snakeTantilla jani (Günther, 1895)
 Tantilla impensa Campbell, 1998
 Equator centipede snakeTantilla melanocephala (Linnaeus, 1758)
 Blackbelly centipede snakeTantilla moesta (Günther, 1863)
 Big bend black-headed snakeTantilla rubra Cope, 1876
 Red earth centipede snakeTantilla schistosa (Bocourt, 1883)
 Central American centipede snakeTantilla taeniata (Bocourt, 1883)
 Volcan Tacana centipede snakeTantilla tayrae Wilson, 1983
 Tantilla tecta Campbell and Smith, 1998
 Tantilla vulcani Campbell, 1998
 Speckled dwarf short-tail snakeTantillita brevissima (Taylor, 1937)
 Yucatecan dwarf short-tail snakeTantillita canula (Cope, 1876)
 Linton's dwarf short-tail snakeTantillita lintoni (Smith, 1940)
 Blackneck garter snakeThamnophis cyrtopsis (Kennicott, 1860)
 Highland garter snakeThamnophis fulvus (Bocourt, 1893)
 Checkered garter snakeThamnophis marcianus (Baird and Girard, 1853)
 Western ribbon snakeThamnophis proximus (Say, 1823)
 Orangebelly swamp snakeTretanorhinus nigroluteus Cope 1861
 Western lyre snakeTrimorphodon biscutatus (Duméril and Bibron, 1854)
 False Fer-de-lanceXenodon rabdocephalus (Wied, 1824)

Elapidae 
Order: Squamata. 
Family: Elapidae

Elapidae is a family of venomous snakes found in tropical and subtropical regions around the world, terrestrially in Asia, Australia, Africa, North America and South America and aquatically in the Pacific and Indian Oceans. Elapid snakes exist in a wide range of sizes, from 18 cm species of Drysdalia to the 5.6 m king cobra, and are characterized by hollow, fixed fangs through which they inject venom from glands located towards the rear of the upper jaws. In outward appearance terrestrial elapids look similar to the Colubridae: almost all have long and slender bodies with smooth scales, a head that is covered with large shields and not always distinct from the neck, and eyes with round pupils. In addition, their behavior is usually quite active and most are oviparous. Currently, 61 genera that include 325 species are recognized worldwide. Eight species of Elapid snake occur in Guatemala, seven of which are coral snakes and one a sea snake.

Brown's coral snakeMicrurus browni Schmidt and Smith, 1943
Variable coral snakeMicrurus diastema (Duméril, Bibron, and Duméril, 1854)
Elegant coral snakeMicrurus elegans (Jan, 1858)
Mayan coral snakeMicrurus hippocrepis (Peters, 1862)
Micrurus latifasciatus Schmidt, 1933
Central American coral snakeMicrurus nigrocinctus (Girard, 1854)
Stuart's coral snakeMicrurus stuarti Roze, 1967
Yellow-bellied sea snakePelamis platurus (Linnaeus, 1766)

Viperidae 

Order: Squamata. 
Family: Viperidae

The Viperidae are a family of venomous snakes found all over the world, except in Antarctica, Australia, Ireland, Madagascar, Hawaii, various other isolated islands, and north of the Arctic Circle. All have relatively long, hinged fangs that permit deep penetration and injection of venom. Four subfamilies are currently recognized. The subfamily Crotalinae, commonly known as "pit vipers", are the only viperids found in the Americas. They are distinguished by the presence of a heat-sensing pit organ located between the eye and the nostril on either side of the head. Currently, 18 genera and 151 species are recognized: 7 genera and 54 species in the Old World, against a greater diversity of 11 genera and 97 species in the New World. Of these, 6 genera and 13 species are found in Guatemala.
CantilAgkistrodon bilineatus Günther, 1863
Mexican jumping pitviperAtropoides nummifer (Rüppel)
Guatemalan jumping pitviperAtropoides occiduus (Hoge, 1966)
Guatemalan palm viperBothriechis aurifer (Salvin, 1860)
Guatemalan tree viperBothriechis bicolor (Bocourt, 1868)
Eyelash viperBothriechis schlegelii (Berthold, 1846)
Honduran palm-pitviperBothriechis marchi (Barbour & Loveridge, 1929)
Merendon palm-pitviperBothriechis thalassinus (Campbell & Smith, 2000)
TerciopeloBothrops asper (Garman, 1883)
Godman's pit viperCerrophidion godmani (Günther)
Rainforest hognosed pitviperPorthidium nasutum (Bocourt, 1868)
Slender hognosed pitviperPorthidium ophryomegas (Bocourt, 1868)
Middle American rattlesnakeCrotalus simus Latreille In Sonnini & Latreille, 1801

See also 
List of amphibians of Guatemala
List of birds of Guatemala
List of mammals of Guatemala

Notes

References 

 
Reptiles
Guatemala
Guatemala